Rakasaha is a village in Kamsaar in the Indian state of Uttar Pradesh. Almost 6500 Kamsaar Pathans lived in the village as of 2011.

Rakasha village was established by Zamindar Mubarak khan in late 1500ADs. Zamindar Mubarak khan was a Grand son Narhar khan founder of Dildarnagar kamsar. According 2011 census the main population of the village live in an area of 200 acres with the total 11125 people residing in.

Histrorical Population

References 

Dildarnagar

Villages in Ghazipur district
Towns and villages in Kamsar